Aric Anderson (born April 9, 1965) a former linebacker in the National Football League who played for the Green Bay Packers. In 1988–1992 Aric Anderson played Arena football; two years for Pittsburgh Gladiators, one year for Detroit Drive, and two years for Albany Firebirds.  Anderson played collegiate ball for Millikin University and played professionally for one season in the NFL. Anderson was an assistant coach for the Dallas Arena Football team (Vigilantes) for the 2010 season. He also played for the Miami Dolphins. Aric Anderson is married to Lynnette Anderson. Aric has four children, Courtney, Cristen, Brooke, and Rylee. Anderson now lives in Texas.

References

Living people
People from Waverly, Iowa
Players of American football from Iowa
American football linebackers
Green Bay Packers players
Pittsburgh Gladiators players
Detroit Drive players
Albany Firebirds players
Dallas Vigilantes coaches
1965 births